Proparamenia is a genus of solenogasters, shell-less, worm-like marine mollusks.

Species
 Proparamenia bivalens Nierstrasz, 1902

References

External links
 Nierstrasz, H. (1902). The Solenogastres of the Siboga-Expedition. Siboga-Expeditie. 47: 1-46

Solenogastres